{{DISPLAYTITLE:C14H20N2}}
The molecular formula C14H20N2 may refer to:

 Cipralisant
 Diethyltryptamine, a psychedelic drug
 5-Ethyl-DMT
 N-Methyl-N-isopropyltryptamine
 Methylpropyltryptamine